The Forest of Nisene Marks State Park is a state park of California, United States, protecting a secondary forest in the watershed of Aptos Creek and Soquel Creek within the Santa Cruz Mountains.

History
The park was named after Nisene Marks, a passionate nature lover and the mother of a Salinas farming family that purchased the land from lumber companies (and others) in the hopes of finding oil. After drilling efforts failed to find any oil, Marks' children donated the original  of land in her memory to the state of California (with the help of the Nature Conservancy) in 1963.

The first people to live on the land of Nisene Marks were the Ohlone tribe. They relied on the land, harvesting and utilizing the natural resources along the edges of the forest. The park is on land that was clear-cut during a forty-year period of logging (1883–1923) by the Loma Prieta Lumber Company. Evidence of logging operations, mill sites and trestles is visible in the park. In recent years, an ancient grove of redwood trees was preserved and added to the park.

The park is a popular spot for running, hiking and horseback riding. Mountain biking is restricted to the fire road as of 2004 because of deed restrictions regarding the state park.

The epicenter of the Loma Prieta earthquake on October 17, 1989 was in this park. The quake's epicenter and Five Finger Falls are the two most popular attractions in the park.

Natural history
Four-fifths of the park is covered in dense redwood forest. Chaparral is found on a few of the hotter, steeper ridges. Douglas firs grow among redwoods in a number of areas. Other trees species include: alders, maples, and cottonwoods near creeks; tanoaks in the understory of redwoods; and Pacific madrone, California bay, and several oak species.

The park is inhabited by a number of animals. This list includes banana slugs, which can be found in various forests in Santa Cruz, as well as California slender salamanders. Additionally, a multitude of plant varieties can be found in the park. Various mushrooms and native plants are commonly seen, including parrot mushrooms and Solomon's plume flowers.

Geology 
The San Andreas, San Gregorio, and Zayante earthquake faults affect the geology of the state park. Slightly southeast of park boundaries runs the San Gregorio; the Zayante fault intersects with the Aptos Creek Canyon in the park, and the San Andreas fault runs parallel to the Northeastern border.

The epicenter of the Loma Prieta earthquake on October 17, 1989 was in this park. The quake's epicenter and Five Finger Falls are the two most popular attractions in the park. Various ancient sea stone sedimentary rocks can be found in creek beds in the park, as the park used to be a shallow inland sea. The soil of the park is sandy and loamy, and therefore vulnerable to landslides.

Recreation 
The park is a popular spot for running, hiking, and horseback riding. Additionally, it is a common location for mountain biking, which can be done on several trails including the Aptos Rancho Trail, Split Stuff Trail, Terrace Trail, and Vienna Woods Trail. The park includes picnic tables where visitors can sit and enjoy the sights.

Regulations 

 Natural and cultural features of the park may not be removed or disturbed.
 Stay on marked trails to avoid erosion.
 Biking is only permitted on the Aptos Creek fire road and the four single track trails below the steel bridge.
 Omitting service animals, dogs are only allowed on the Aptos Creek fire road and the four single track trails below the steel bridge. Dogs must be on leash at all times.
 Horses are only permitted on the Aptos Creek fire road and the four single track trails below the steel bridge. Horses are not allowed past the steel bridge.
 There is currently no camping in the park.
 Fires are prohibited in all areas of the park.
 There is an $8 vehicle day use fee.

See also 
List of California state parks

References

External links 

The Forest of Nisene Marks State Park state site
The Forest of Nisene Marks State Park Friends of Santa Cruz State Parks site

State parks of California
Parks in Santa Cruz County, California
Coast redwood groves
Santa Cruz Mountains
Aptos, California
Parks in the San Francisco Bay Area
Protected areas established in 1963
1963 establishments in California